= Kampung Sungai Lada =

Kampung Sungai Lada is a village in Federal Territory of Labuan, Malaysia.
